Pedro Cabrera (born 26 April 1927) is a Spanish fencer. He competed in the individual and team épée events at the 1960 Summer Olympics.

References

External links
 

1927 births
Possibly living people
Spanish male épée fencers
Olympic fencers of Spain
Fencers at the 1960 Summer Olympics